Commercial Album is an album released by art rock group the Residents in 1980. It is commonly considered a follow-up to Duck Stab/Buster & Glen, in that it retains the former album's pop-oriented song structures. The album contains 40 songs, each lasting exactly one minute - a deliberate allusion to Top 40 mainstream radio. The album's liner notes state that, to form a complete pop song, tracks from the album should be played three times in a row.

The album features a number of guest musicians, notably Chris Cutler and Fred Frith from Henry Cow. Other guests are featured anonymously, such as Andy Partridge from XTC (as "Sandy Sandwich") and Lene Lovich (as "Mud's Sis"). It has also been recently confirmed that Brian Eno and David Byrne appear on the album uncredited.

As a promotional stunt, the Residents purchased 40 one-minute advertising slots on San Francisco's most popular Top 40 radio station at the time, KFRC, such that the station played each track of the album over three days. This prompted an editorial in Billboard magazine questioning whether the act was art or advertising.

Track listing 
All tracks last exactly one minute, but with a 3-second pause between songs, making each track last around 1:03. On the original LP version of the album, "Die in Terror" is incorrectly printed as track 14, between "The Nameless Souls" and "Love Leaks Out".

1988 CD bonus tracks 

 Tracks 41 and 42 are outtakes from the album, released separately as the Commercial Single.
 Track 44 was recorded for the 1980 Morgan Fisher project Miniatures.
 Tracks 45-48 were previously released on the 1983 compilation Residue.
 Track 49 was previously released as a single in 1984.
 Track 50 was previously released as a single in 1987.

2019 pREServed edition bonus tracks 
After a small bit of silence, an unlisted track plays, a "concentrate" mix of the advertisements that were aired in promotion of the album on KFRC.

Personnel 
Written and produced by the Residents
Guest musicians:
Fred Frith: Guitar on 'Japanese Watercolor', ''Moisture'& 'The Coming of The Crow'
Special Appearances 
Chris Cutler – Drums on 'Love Leaks Out', 'Moisture' & 'The Coming of The Crow'
Don Jackovich – Drums on 'Love Leaks Out'
Sandy Sandwich – vocals, guitar on "Margaret Freeman" 
Mud's Sis –  Special Appearance
Snakefinger – Special Appearance on 'Moisture', & Vocals on 'Ups And Down'
Secret Special Appearances 
Lene Lovich – Secret Special Appearance
Nessie Lessons – Vocals on 'Amber'
Brian Eno – Synthesizer on "The Coming of the Crow"
David Byrne – Backing vocals on "Suburban Bathers"
Cover design and art direction:
Pore Know Graphics

References

The Residents albums
1980 albums
Charisma Records albums
Ralph Records albums
Concept albums